The 2021–22 St. Louis Blues season was the 55th season for the National Hockey League franchise that was established in 1967. On April 16, 2022, the Blues clinched a playoff spot after a 6–5 overtime win against the Minnesota Wild.

The Blues set a franchise record with a 16-game point scoring streak from April 1-24. 
The Blues upset the Minnesota Wild in six games in the First Round, but lost to the Stanley Cup-winning Colorado Avalanche in six games in the Second Round.

Standings

Divisional standings

Conference standings

Schedule and results

Regular season
The regular season schedule was published on July 22, 2021.

Playoffs

Player statistics

Skaters

Goaltenders

†Denotes player spent time with another team before joining the Blues. Stats reflect time with the Blues only.
‡Denotes player was traded mid-season. Stats reflect time with the Blues only.
Bold/italics denotes franchise record.

Transactions
The Blues have been involved in the following transactions during the 2021–22 season.

Trades

Players acquired

Players lost

Signings

Draft picks

Below are the St. Louis Blues' selections at the 2021 NHL Entry Draft, which were held on July 23 to 24, 2021. It was held virtually via Video conference call from the NHL Network studio in Secaucus, New Jersey.

References

St. Louis Blues seasons
St. Louis Blues
St. Louis Blues
St. Louis Blues